Wendell R. Good (August 28, 1912 – August 1975) is a former Republican member of the Pennsylvania House of Representatives. Good was a represent of the 3rd district from 1969 to 1972.

References

Republican Party members of the Pennsylvania House of Representatives
1912 births
1975 deaths
20th-century American politicians